Richard Royal Lunt is a chemical engineer, materials scientist, physicist, and the Johansen Crosby Professor of Chemical Engineering and Materials Science at Michigan State University (MSU) in East Lansing, Michigan, in the United States.  He is most well known for the development of invisible solar cells.

Early life and education 
Lunt was born outside of Philadelphia in 1982. At age 10 he moved to Lexington, Massachusetts. He then attended the University of Delaware, where he received his bachelor's degree in chemical engineering in 2004. He received his Ph.D. from Princeton University in 2010 and performed postdoctoral research at the Massachusetts Institute of Technology until 2011. He moved to MSU in 2011 after starting to build his laboratory in 2010. He is married to Dr. Sophia Lunt, a professor in the Department of Biochemistry and Molecular Biology at MSU.

Research 
Lunt's research lab is focused on developing organic and quantum dot electronics. He is known for developing a key method to measure exciton diffusion lengths and for pioneering the first invisible solar cells, invisible solar concentrators, and phosphorescent nanocluster light emitting diodes.  Lunt is a cofounder of Ubiquitous Energy, Inc., which is focused on commercializing clear solar cells.

Honors 
Lunt’s work has been recognized by a number of awards, including:  the NSF CAREER Award in 2013; the DuPont Young Professor Award in  2013; the Camille and Henry Dreyfus Postdoctoral Environmental Chemistry Mentor Award in 2015; and the 2015 Ovshinsky Sustainable Energy Award from the American Physical Society.  In 2016, he was named to the MIT Technology Review TR35 as one of the top 35 innovators in the world under the age of 35.  Lunt has also been recognized for his devotion and skill in teaching.

References

External links 
 Richard Lunt's academic profile
 Lunt Research Group @ MSU (Molecular and Organic Excitonics Lab)
 The solar cell that is transparent like glass. Keynote Prof. Richard Lunt at BMW Welcomes.
 Transparent Solar Concentrator

1982 births
Living people
21st-century American physicists
Michigan State University faculty
American materials scientists
University of Delaware alumni
Princeton University alumni